"Youth Against Fascism" is the second single from Sonic Youth's 1992 album Dirty. It was released in 1992 on DGC.

Track listing
 "Youth Against Fascism (Clean-Ex Mix)"
 "The Destroyed Room"
 "Purr (Mark Goodier Version)"
 "Youth Against Fascism (LP Version)"

The semi-acoustic "Purr" was taken from a Mark Goodier BBC session from July 20, 1992. A live version of "The Destroyed Room" was previously released on the "Dirty Boots" single under the title "The Bedroom".

Ian MacKaye of Minor Threat and Fugazi contributed additional guitar parts to the title track.

The line "I believe Anita Hill" referred to the controversy surrounding the 1991 appointment of Judge Clarence Thomas to the Supreme Court over allegations of sexual harassment from Hill, a former subordinate.

Music video
The music video for "Youth Against Fascism" was directed by Nick Egan. The video was shot in the concrete flood control channel of the Los Angeles River, with the band playing while FMX bikers ride around. Imagery of fascism, Nazism and communism was spliced into the video, plus an insurrection mixed with pictures of punk bands and fashion.

Singles chart

References

Sonic Youth songs
1992 singles
Protest songs
1992 songs
Songs against racism and xenophobia
Anti-fascist music
DGC Records singles